Vernonia verrucosa is a species of plant in the family Asteraceae. It is native to Angola and Zambia. It can grow up to 75 cm with stems, usually purple that are uniformly leafy, glabrous.

References 

verrucosa
Flora of Angola
Flora of Zambia